Petrovac may refer to:

Bosnia and Herzegovina 
 Bosanski Petrovac, town and municipality in Una-Sana Canton
 Petrovac, Bosnia and Herzegovina, municipality in Republika Srpska

Montenegro 
 Petrovac, Budva, coastal town in Budva Municipality

Serbia 
 Petrovac, Serbia, town and municipality in the Braničevo District
 Bački Petrovac, town and municipality in South Bačka District of Vojvodina
 Petrovac (Aerodrom), village in Aerodrom Municipality, city of Kragujevac
 Petrovac (Lebane), village in Lebane Municipality, Jablanica District
 Petrovac (Leskovac), a village in Leskovac Municipality, Jablanica District
 Petrovac (Pirot), village in Pirot Municipality, Pirot District
 Petrovac (Prokuplje), village in Prokuplje Municipality, Toplica District
 Petrovac (Trgovište), village in Trgovište Municipality, Pčinja District

See also 
 Petrovec, North Macedonia